Eating Out: All You Can Eat is a 2009 American sex comedy film directed by Glenn Gaylord. It is the third installment in the Eating Out film series. The only returning character from the first two films is Tiffani (Rebekah Kochan), while Mink Stole reprises her role as Aunt Helen from the second film.

Plot
After the funeral of Marc and Kyle (who had been giving one another oral sex in the car until Celine Dion's tour bus collided with theirs while going the wrong way), Kyle's mom Helen (Mink Stole) takes in her nephew, geeky but cute Casey (Daniel Skelton), and gives his number to Tiffani von der Sloot (Rebekah Kochan), Kyle's infamous slutty fag hag friend, who hires him at her salon Nail Me. They venture to the local LGBT center so Casey can volunteer for an upcoming event, and Casey meets Zack (Chris Salvatore), a gorgeous frequent visitor. So Tiffani and Casey set up a phony online profile using the image of Tiffani's buff ex, Ryan... which works fine until the real Ryan (Michael E.R. Walker) shows up. Ryan pretends to be gay to aggravate Tiffani, so he accepts Zack's date, but later bails. Zack finds Casey to talk to, but then finds out that Casey and Ryan had both lied to him. Ryan and Tiffani both wanted to help get Casey and Zack together, so they shut the door and lock them in a room together to talk through it. But the problem was not getting solved, so Ryan, although he is straight, decides to strip and get into a threesome to get Casey and Zack together. Only through some fancy footwork, advice from Aunt Helen and mentor Harry (Leslie Jordan), and a daring sexual escapade can Casey figure out how to set things right and perhaps even find the love he's been seeking.

Cast
 Rebekah Kochan as Tiffani von der Sloot
 Daniel Skelton as Casey
 Chris Salvatore as Zack
 Michael E.R. Walker as Ryan
 Mink Stole as Aunt Helen
 Leslie Jordan as Harry
 John Stallings as Lionel
 Julia Cho as Tandy
 Sumalee Montano as Pam
 Christina Balmores as Candy
 Tabitha Taylor as Tabitha
 Maximiliano Torandell as Ernesto

Reception
On Rotten Tomatoes, Eating Out: All You Can Eat currently holds a 17% 'Rotten' rating based on 6 reviews, making it the second-highest reviewed Eating Out film on the site. The first film holds a 16% and the second holding a 44%.

Neil Genzlinger wrote in The New York Times that "The sex (of which there isn't much) isn't sexy, and the humor isn't funny."

References

External links
 
 
 The New York Times review

Eating Out (film series)
2009 films
2009 independent films
2009 LGBT-related films
2009 romantic comedy films
2000s sex comedy films
American independent films
American LGBT-related films
American romantic comedy films
American sequel films
American sex comedy films
Films shot in Los Angeles
Gay-related films
LGBT-related romantic comedy films
LGBT-related sex comedy films
2000s English-language films
2000s American films